Église Saint-François-Xavier de Monticello is a church in Monticello, Haute-Corse, Corsica. The building was classified as a Historic Monument in 1992.

References

Churches in Corsica
Monuments historiques of Corsica
Buildings and structures in Haute-Corse